Ezgi Başaran (born 20 January 2003) is a Turkish recurve archer.

Sport career
Ezgi Başaran won the silver medal in the women's team recurve event at the 2022 European Archery Championships held in Munich, Germany.

References

Turkish female archers
Living people
2003 births
Competitors at the 2022 Mediterranean Games
Mediterranean Games gold medalists for Turkey
Mediterranean Games medalists in archery
21st-century Turkish sportswomen